The Innisfail Eagles are a senior ice hockey team based in Innisfail, Alberta, Canada. Alberta Senior AA champions in 2012–13, the Eagles moved up to compete at the Senior AAA level for 2013–14. They played in the Allan Cup Hockey West until 2020 and moved to the Senior AA Ranchland League in 2021-22.

History
The Eagles were founded in 1947.

Season-by-season record
''Note: GP = Games played, W = Wins, L = Losses, T = Ties, OTL = Overtime losses, Pts = Points, GF = Goals for, GA = Goals against

NHL alumni
Brian Sutter (Coach)
Peter Vandermeer
Kevin Smyth
Darryl Laplante
Mike Brodeur

References

External links

Senior ice hockey teams
Ice hockey teams in Alberta
Innisfail, Alberta